Natubhai Gomanbhai Patel (born 4 May 1972 in Silvassa) is an Indian politician, belonging to Bharatiya Janata Party. In the 2009 election he was elected to the 15th Lok Sabha from the Dadra and Nagar Haveli Lok Sabha constituency. He won again in 2014, but lost in 2019 elections.

He is a builder and married to Smt Jayashreeben and has one son and one daughter.

References

External links
 Fifteenth Lok Sabha Members Bioprofile in LO Sahba website

India MPs 2009–2014
1972 births
Living people
People from Dadra and Nagar Haveli
People from Silvassa
Dadra and Nagar Haveli politicians
Lok Sabha members from Dadra and Nagar Haveli
India MPs 2014–2019
Bharatiya Janata Party politicians from Dadra and Nagar Haveli